Timothy Ian Weston (born 17 January 1982, in Stratford) is a cricket player from New Zealand who plays for Central Districts and Watsonians. He is a right-handed batsman (top score 152*), he also plays for Taranaki in the Hawke Cup. He is a teacher at Francis Douglas Memorial College in New Plymouth and plays for the school team in the Taranaki Premier Grade cricket competition along with Central Districts team-mate Peter Ingram who also teaches at the school.

Weston will be playing for Watsonian Cricket Club in Edinburgh, Scotland, for the 2010 season.

Notes

External links
 
 Watsonian Cricket Club

1982 births
Living people
New Zealand cricketers
Central Districts cricketers
Sportspeople from Stratford, New Zealand
Wicket-keepers